Antioquia District is one of thirty-two districts of the province Huarochirí in Peru.

Demography
The population (2017 census) of the district is 1,225 people.

Populated areas

Tourism
The town is colored in an altarpiece style.

Some places people visit are:
 Balcony over the hill Amancaes
 Annex of Cochahuayco 
 Annex of Nieve Nieve 

Also there are camping zones and canaveral extensions. There are ruins of the ancient Capac Ñam (an old Inca road system).

See also
 Huarochirí Province
 Lima Region
 Administrative divisions of Peru

References

External links
  Banco de informacion distrital - INEI